Paul Rémy (17 February 1923 – 14 March 2001) was a French tennis player. He was active in the 1950s, playing in Wimbledon, the US Open, the French Open and the Davis Cup.

References

External links 
 
 

1923 births
2001 deaths
French male tennis players
Pieds-Noirs
Professional tennis players before the Open Era